Copiapó Valley is located in Copiapó Province, Chile. Vine from that valley is labeled with "Valle de Copiapó".

Valleys of Chile
Landforms of Atacama Region